Danira Bilić (born 22 July 1969) is a retired Croatian basketball player. As part of the Yugoslavian women's team, she won a silver medal at the 1988 Seoul Olympics. She was European basketball's Most Valuable Player three times running, in 1988, 1989 and 1990. In 1991, she was awarded Croatia's highest national recognition for sports, the Franjo Bučar State Award for Sport.

Since retiring she has maintained an active involvement in sport, and is currently the Director of the Croatian Heritage Foundation. In 2009 the International Olympic Committee awarded her their "Women in Sports" European trophy.

She is also a politician, being a member of the Parliamentary Assembly of the Council of Europe

She is wife of former Croatian handball player Zvonimir Bilić.

References 

1969 births
Living people
Olympic basketball players of Yugoslavia
Olympic silver medalists for Yugoslavia
Croatian women's basketball players
Yugoslav women's basketball players
Basketball players at the 1988 Summer Olympics
Medalists at the 1988 Summer Olympics
Croatian Democratic Union politicians
Representatives in the modern Croatian Parliament
Basketball players from Šibenik
Olympic medalists in basketball
Croatian sportsperson-politicians
21st-century Croatian women politicians
21st-century Croatian politicians
Shooting guards
ŽKK Šibenik players